Benjamin Ely (born 13 September 1970) is an Australian musician and artist best known for his work with alternative rock band Regurgitator.

Early life
Born in Brisbane, Ely's family moved to the outer suburb of Cleveland.  During his high school years he became friends with musicians members Dave Atkins and Jim Sinclair, with whom he would later form Pangaea.  He met guitarist Quan Yeomans in 1993, with whom he formed Regurgitator. He claims that meeting Yeomans is the most important thing that has ever happened to him, stating that "I am a big fan of his work. I guess that helps when you play in a band with them".   With regard to his musical influences, Ely has previously stated "Metallica and Black Sabbath made me who I am today".

Music
Aside his tenure in Regurgitator, Ely has worked on other music projects:

 Pangaea is a punk and metal band from Brisbane, Australia that Ely fronted since the early 1990s.
 Jump 2 Light Speed released a self-titled album in 2006 and featured Ben Ely on bass and vocals, Graeme Kent on guitar (later replaced by former Channel V presenter Steve Bourke), Keita Tarlinton on keyboards and Stella Mozgawa on drums (later replaced by Tim Browning).
 Broken Head is a dub band featuring Skritch and Guy Webster and formerly Ely.
 The Stalkers is a punk band with Regurgitator member Peter Kostic along with Ray Ahn and Raymond Lalotoa.
 Ouch My Face is an experimental punk band from Melbourne, Australia featuring Ben Ely on Bass, Celeste Potter on guitar and vocals and Ben Wundersitz on drums.
 Pow Pow Wow
 Ben Ely's Radio 5 released his first official solo album, Transcending Reality, in 2008. The band is unusual for its set-up where Ely performs lead vocals while standing up and drumming a simple drum kit made up of flat-lying kick drums, cymbals and snare.
 Solo album "Goodbye Machine" was released in 2015. The back of the album cover states: "Over the last 2 years Ben collected many lyrical ideas in a strange kind of therapy that reflects his discomfort with the current government, state of the environment, and our place as human beings in this world." A different musical direction once again for the highly versatile Ely.
Ely also co-wrote, (together with Decoder Ring), the music to the 2004 Australian film  Somersault, starring Abbie Cornish.  The soundtrack won an AFI Award for Best Original Music Score and the song 'Somersault' won the 2004 Best Original Song Composed for a Feature Film, Telemovie, TV Series or Mini-Series Award at the Australian Screen Music Awards.

Personal life
Ely is also a successful practising artist and has exhibited work at The TAP Gallery in Darlinghurst, Sydney, and Flipbook Gallery in Brisbane as well as an exhibition in Fitzroy, Melbourne with his female Ouch My Face bandmate.

Game Over! art exhibition.

Ely was the partner of Yumi Stynes from 2001. They separated after eight years, in 2008. They have two daughters, Anouk and Dee Dee. He later remarried and had more children with his new partner

References

External links
 Ben Ely Facebook
 Regurgitator On Tour

1970 births
APRA Award winners
Living people
Musicians from Brisbane
Australian songwriters
People from Redland City